Antônio José Santana Martins (born 11 October 1936), known professionally as Tom Zé, is a Brazilian singer-songwriter, multi-instrumentalist, and composer who was influential in the Tropicália movement of 1960s Brazil. After the peak of the Tropicália period, Zé went into relative obscurity: it was only in the 1990s, when musician and Luaka Bop label head David Byrne discovered Zé's 1975 album Estudando o Samba and then released reissues of his work, that Zé returned to performing and releasing new material.

Early life and career
Tom Zé grew up in the small town of Irará, Bahia in the dry sertão region of the country's Northeast.  He would later claim that his hometown was "pre-Gutenbergian", as information was primarily transferred through oral communication.  As a child, he was influenced by Brazilian musicians such as Luiz Gonzaga and Jackson do Pandeiro. Zé became interested in music by listening to the radio, and moved to the state capital of Salvador to pursue a degree. He later relocated to São Paulo and began his career in popular music there.

Career
Much of his early work involved his wry impressions of the massive metropolitan area, coming as he did, from a small town in the relatively poor northeast.

Influential in the Tropicália movement, Zé contributed, along with Caetano Veloso, Gilberto Gil, Gal Costa, Os Mutantes, and Nara Leão, to the watershed Tropicália album/manifesto Tropicália: ou Panis et Circenses (1968). He also participated in a series of concerts with the musicians. After the Brazilian military government of the 1960s began to crack down on the musicians of Tropicália, Zé moved out of the public eye and began to experiment with novel instruments and composition styles. While the other major figures of Tropicália would go on to great commercial and critical success in later decades, Zé slipped into obscurity in the 1970s and 1980s.

Re-emergence
In the early 1990s, Zé's work experienced a revival when American musician David Byrne discovered one of his albums, Estudando o Samba (1975), on a visit to Rio de Janeiro.  Zé was the first artist signed to the Luaka Bop label and has so far released a compilation and two albums, all of which received positive reviews from critics in the United States.

In 2011, he collaborated with Javelin on the song "Ogodô, Ano 2000" for the Red Hot Organization's most recent charitable album Red Hot+Rio 2. The album is a follow-up to the 1996 Red Hot + Rio. Proceeds from the sales will be donated to raise awareness and money to fight AIDS, HIV and related health and social issues.

Style
Remaining true to the experimental and Dada impulses of Tropicália, Zé has been noted for both his unorthodox approach to melody and instrumentation, employing various objects as instruments such as the typewriter. He has collaborated with many of the concrete poets of São Paulo, including Augusto de Campos, and employed concrete techniques in his lyrics.  Musically, his work appropriates samba, Bossa Nova, Brazilian folk music, forró, and American rock and roll, among others.  He has been praised by avant-garde composers for his use of dissonance, polytonality, and unusual time signatures.  Because of the experimental nature of many of his compositions, Zé has been compared with American musicians such as Frank Zappa and Captain Beefheart.

One of his last efforts, though, has been a return to Bossa Nova, his Estudando a Bossa – Nordeste Plaza. Says Zé: "That music has inhabited my psyche for 50 to 60 years. Familiar and profound, yet somehow extraterrestrial in my mind. It had to come out, to be dealt with."

Discography
1968: Grande Liquidação
1970: Tom Zé (album)
1972: Se o Caso É Chorar1973: Todos os Olhos1976: Estudando o Samba1978: Correio da Estação do Brás1984: Nave Maria1990: Brazil Classics, Vol. 4: The Best of Tom Zé - Massive Hits (Compilation)
1992: Brazil Classics, Vol. 5: The Hips of Tradition1997: Parabelo (with Zé Miguel Wisnik)
1998: Com Defeito de Fabricação1999: Postmodern Platos1999: 20 Preferidas  (Compilation)
2000: Série Dois Momentos (vols. 1, 2, and 15) (Compilation)
2000: Jogos de Armar2002: Santagustin (with Gilberto Assis)
2003: Imprensa Cantada2005: Estudando o Pagode – Na Opereta Segregamulher e Amor2006: Danç-Êh-Sá2008: Danç-Êh-Sá Ao Vivo (live)
2008: Estudando a Bossa – Nordeste Plaza2009: O Pirulito Da Ciência – Tom Zé & Banda Ao Vivo2010: Studies of Tom Zé: Explaining Things So I Can Confuse You2012: Tropicália Lixo Lógico2014: Vira Lata na Via Láctea2016: Canções Eróticas de Ninar2017: Sem Você Não A2022: Língua BrasileiraReferences

Further reading
 Mei, Giancarlo. Canto Latino: Origine, Evoluzione e Protagonisti della Musica Popolare del Brasile.'' 2004. Stampa Alternativa-Nuovi Equilibri. Preface by Sergio Bardotti and postface by Milton Nascimento.

External links

Official site 
Tom Zé on the Luaka Bop label website
Tom Zé discography  on Slipcue.com
Tom Zé interview  on ArtistInterviews.eu
Biography on allmusic.com

1936 births
Living people
Brazilian people of Portuguese descent
20th-century Brazilian male singers
20th-century Brazilian singers
People from Bahia
Música Popular Brasileira musicians
Brazilian multi-instrumentalists
Luaka Bop artists
Tropicália
Latin music songwriters
21st-century Brazilian male singers
21st-century Brazilian singers